Lieutenant-Colonel Sir Francis Henry Humphrys  
(24 April 1879 – 28 August 1971) was a British cricketer, colonial administrator and diplomat.

Early life and cricket
Francis Henry Humphrys was born in Shropshire, at Beatrice Street, Oswestry, where his father was assistant master at Oswestry School.   He was educated at Shrewsbury School, where he was captain of cricket and head of the school, and Christ Church, Oxford, where he played first-class cricket for Oxford University.  His first-class debut came against the touring Australians in 1899.  He played 3 further first-class matches in 1900, the last coming against Sussex. In his 4 first-class matches, he took 13 wickets at a bowling average of 19.46, with best figures of 4/16. While at school, and later, he also played Minor Counties Championship cricket for Wiltshire.

Career
After graduating from Oxford in 1900, Humphrys joined the Worcestershire Regiment and served in the Second Boer War. Following the war he was in February 1902 seconded to the Indian Staff Corps, and in October the same year he left his regiment and was transferred to the Indian Army. He was seconded to the Political Service and spent most of this part of his career in the North-West Frontier Province, although in 1918, towards the end of World War I he returned to Europe and served with a temporary commission in the newly formed Royal Air Force. In 1919 he returned to India, first as a political agent and then, in 1921, as deputy Foreign Secretary in the Government of India.

Following the Anglo-Afghan "Treaty of Kabul" of 22 November 1921, in early 1922 Humphrys was appointed the first British Minister to the Amir of Afghanistan, Amānullāh Khān.
In November 1928 a rebellion began in Jalalabad and tribal forces marched on Kabul, and in early 1929 Humphrys supervised the evacuation by air of several hundred Europeans in what became known as the Kabul Airlift. In the House of Commons on 4 February the Foreign Secretary, Austen Chamberlain, commended both Humphrys and his wife for their 'courage and fortitude'. In the King's Birthday Honours of that year Humphrys was given the additional knighthood of KCMG and Lady Humphrys was made DBE.

Later in 1929 Humphrys was appointed to be High Commissioner in the Kingdom of Iraq, 
then under British administration. Following the Anglo-Iraqi Treaty (1930), which Humphrys signed for the United Kingdom, on 3 October 1932 Iraq became an independent kingdom and Humphrys became the first British Ambassador to Iraq.

In 1935 Humphrys retired from the diplomatic service and was appointed chairman of a Sugar Tribunal which resulted in the creation of the British Sugar Corporation, of which he was chairman from its formation from 1936 to 1949. He was also the director of several other companies and was the chairman of the Iraq Petroleum Company from 1941 to 1950.

Family
In 1907 Francis Humphrys married Gertrude Mary Deane, known as "Gertie", elder daughter of Sir Harold Deane, Chief Commissioner of the North-West Frontier Province. They had a son and two daughters.

He died at a nursing home at Hamstead Marshall near Newbury, Berkshire in 1971, aged ninety-two.  Lady Humphrys died in 1973.

Honours
Francis Humphrys was knighted KBE in the King's Birthday Honours of 1924, awarded the additional honours of GCVO in 1928 and KCMG in 1929, and promoted GCMG in the New Year Honours of 1932. Amānullāh Khān made him a member of the Nishan-i-Sardari (Order of the Leader), with the title of Sardar-i-ala, in 1928; the King of Iraq awarded him the Grand Cordon of the Wisam al-Rafidain (Order of the Two Rivers) in 1933.

Offices held

See also
1929 in Afghanistan
British Mandate of Iraq
Anglo-Iraqi Treaty (1930)

References

External links
  Francis Humphrys at ESPNcricinfo
 Francis Humphrys at CricketArchive
 HUMPHRYS, Lt-Col Sir Francis Henry, Who Was Who, A & C Black, 1920–2008; online edn, Oxford University Press, Dec 2007 
 Peter Sluglett, Humphrys, Sir Francis Henry (1879–1971), Oxford Dictionary of National Biography, Oxford University Press, 2004, online edn, May 2006
 Sir Francis Humphrys – Distinguished career in Afghanistan and Iraq, The Times, London, 1 September 1971, page 14

1879 births
1971 deaths
People educated at Shrewsbury School
English cricketers
Wiltshire cricketers
Oxford University cricketers
Alumni of Christ Church, Oxford
Worcestershire Regiment officers
British Army personnel of the Second Boer War
Indian Army personnel of World War I
British World War I pilots
Ambassadors of the United Kingdom to Afghanistan
Ambassadors of the United Kingdom to Iraq
Knights Grand Cross of the Order of St Michael and St George
Knights Grand Cross of the Royal Victorian Order
Knights Commander of the Order of the British Empire
Companions of the Order of the Indian Empire
British Indian Army officers
Indian Political Service officers
Military personnel from Shropshire